This is a list of Hindu temples in Malaysia.

Federal territories

Kuala Lumpur
 Sri Kshemankhari Durgai Amman Alayam, Taman Kepong Baru Tambahan
 Sri Navagraha Nayagi Durgai Amman Alayam – Kepong, Taman Sri Sinar
 Sri Veera Muniswarar Alayam, Batu 5, Jalan Ipoh
 Sri Paranjothi Vinayagar Temple, Jalan Ipoh
 Sri Maha Mariamman Temple, Jalan Tun H. S. Lee
 Sri Ganesar Aalayam, Kampong Pandan
 Sri Aiynareeswarar Temple, Taman Melawati, Setapak
 Sri Maha Mariamman Temple, Sri Segambut, Taman Cuepecs
 Sri Karumariamman Temple, Jalan Sentul
 Sri Nageswary Amman Temple, Bangsar
 Sri Maha Kaliamman Temple, Jalan Kasipillay, Jalan Ipoh
 Sri Kamakshi Ambal Alayam, Jalan Bukit Bangsar Off Lorong Maarof, Bangsar
 Sri Arulmigu Devi Sri Raja Kaliamman Kovil, Brickfields
 Angkasapuri Sri Maha Kaliamman Alayam
 Kuil Sri Kamatchi Amman Aalayam, Jalan Perkasa Satu, Taman Maluri, Cheras
 Sri Thohaiyadi Vinayagar Kovil, Jalan Cheras
 Sri Kandaswamy Kovil – Scott Road, Brickfields
 Sri Maha Eeswaran Temple – Kg. Bumi Hijau, Setapak
 Sri Kottumalai Pillayar Temple – Pudu
 Sri Thandayuthapani Temple, Jalan Ipoh
 Sri Muneeswarar Temple – 60 Jalan Perkasa, Kampung Pandan
 Sri Shakti Vinayagar Temple – Brickfields
 Sree Veera Hanuman Temple – Scott Road, Brickfields
 Sri Sakthi Maha Mariamman Alayam – Jalan Robson Off Jalan Seputeh, Brickfields
 Sri Sidthi Vinayagar Kovil Paripalana Sangam  – Jalan Brunei
 Kuil Sri Maha Muneswarar – Jalan Scott, Brickfields
 Kuil Sri Krishna Temple, Jalan Scott, Brickfields
 Murugan Temple, Jalan Tebing, Brickfields
 Arulmigu Kailayanaathar Sivan Temple – Pangkalan TUDM, Sg Besi
 Sri Laxmi Narayan Mandir, Jalan Kasipillay, off Jalan Ipoh
 Arulmigu Muneeswarar Thirukovil, Jalan Seberau, Batu 4 Cheras
 Sri Muthumariamman Temple, Setapak, Air Panas
 Om Sri Maha Kaliamman Alayam, Jalan Berhala, Brickfields
 Sri Maha Mariamman Alayam Bukit Kiara, TTDI
 Ahthi Eeswaran Templ, Sentul
 Om Jay Maha Muni Pathie Amma Alayam - Segambut
 Dewi Sri Pathra Kaliamman, Jalan Masjid India
 Om Sri Maha Veera Jada Muniswaran Aalaya, Jalan E3/1, Taman Ehsan, Kepong
 Sri Arulmighu Maha Kaliamman Alayam, Bandar Baru Sentul
 Sri Maha Veera Muniswarar Alayam, Jalan Ang Seng, Brickfields
 Shree Durga Devi, Gurkha Mandhir, Kampung Batu Muda, Jalan Ipoh
 Pertubuhan Persatuan Kovil Sri Maha Munesswarar Lorong Raja Muda Abdul Aziz
 Muniswaran Temple, Pusat Latihan Polis, Jalan Sultan Yahya Petra

West Malaysia

Perlis
 Arau Muniswaran Temple, Arau (அரவு முனீஸ்வரன் கோவில்)
 Sri Maha Mariamman Devasthana Sabha Temple, Jalan Besar Pauh, Arau (ஸ்ரீ மகா மாரியம்மன் தேவஸ்தான சபை ஆலயம்)
 Kuil Sree Veera Maha Batra Kali Amman, Pauh, Arau (கோயில் ஸ்ரீ வீர மகா பத்ர காளி அம்மன்)
 Sri Kamatchi Amman Koil, Stesen keretapi Padang Besar, Padang Besar (ஸ்ரீ காமாட்சி அம்மன் கோயில்)
 Kuil Sri Muniswarar, Kampung Kolam, Padang Besar (ஸ்ரீ முனீஸ்வரர் கோவில்)
 Arulmigu Arumugaswamy Dhevasthanam, Pusat Bandar Kangar, Kangar ( அருள்மிகு ஆறுமுக சுவாமி தேவஸ்தானம்/Kangar Hindu Temple)
 Sri Maha Muniswara Aalayam, Taman Pangkalan Asam, Kangar (ஸ்ரீ மஹா முனீஸ்வரர் ஆலயம்)
 Kuil Sri Maha Veera Kaliamman, Kampung Bukit Lagi, Kangar (குயில் ஸ்ரீ மகா வீர காளியம்மன்)

Kedah
 Sri Ruthra Veeramuthu Maha Mariamman Devasthanam (U. P.), Sungai Petani
 Sri Thandayuthabany Nattukottai Chettiar Temple, Jalan Tunku Putra, Kulim
 Sri Maha Karumariamman Thirukkovil Taman Permaipura (Riverside), Bedong
 Sri Thandayuthapani Kovil, Alor Setar
 Sri Maha Mariamman Devasthanam, Alor Setar
 Sri Maha Mariamman Temple, Sungai Petani
 Sri Subramaniyar Temple, Sungai Petani
 Sri Sithi Vinayagar Temple, Sungai Petani
 Sri Siddhi Vinayagar Temple, Bedong
 Harvard Div 1 Sri Muthu Mariamman Temple, Bedong
 Sri Maha Mariamman Devasthanam, Sungai Tok Pawang, Bedong
 Sri Arasa Maratthu Mariamman Kovil, Sungai Tok Pawang
 Sri Muniswarar Alayam, Central Kedah, Sungai Tok Pawang
 Sri Subramaniam Devasthanam, Baling
 Sri Shivasakthi Alayam, Sungai Petani
 Sri Thurgaiamman Temple, Sungai Petani
 Shirdi Baba Center, Sungai Petani
 Sri Muniswarar Temple, Sungai Petani
 Nandi Asramam Temple, Sungai Petani
 Sri Aiyanar Alayam, Sungai Tukang, Sungai Petani
 Sri Maha Mariamman Devastanam, Batu 2, Jalan Kuala Ketil, Sungai Petani
Sri Maha Mariamman Kampung Air Hitam, Serdang
 Arulmigu Sri Siva Muniswarar Alayam Air Merah, Kulim
 Sri Pathinettam Padi Iyappan, Kg. Paya Besar, Paya Besar, Lunas
 Sri Amirtheswary Sametha Chandramowlisvarar Temple, Kg. Paya Besar, Lunas
 Sri Bhagavathi Amman Alayam, Paya Besar
 Sri Sivasakthi Muniswarar alayam, Batu Putih, Karangan
 Sri Subramaniam Devastanam, Serdang
 Arulmigu Annai Karumariamman Alayam, Paya Besar, Lunas
 Sri Thulasi Amman Devastaanam, Jalan Nuri, Sungai Petani
 Sree Mutu Mariamman Temple, Lunas
 Sri Maha Mariamman Temple, Ladang Lubok Segintah, Kuala Ketil, Bukit Selambau
 Sri Ramar Temple, Sungai Batu Estate, Taman Lembah Bujang, Bedong
Arulmigu Sri Maha Karumariamman Alayam, Kampung Permatang Samak, Bedong

Penang Island

 Arulmigu Balathandayuthapani Temple, Penang, George Town
 Arulmigu Sri Maha Mariamman Temple, George Town
 Arulmigu Ganesar Temple, Jalan Air Terjun (Waterfall Road), George Town
 Nattukkottai Chettiar Temple, Penang, George Town
 Sri Meenakshi Sundaraeswarar Temple, Jalan Air Terjun (Waterfall Road), George Town
 Sri Muneeswaran Temple, Jalan Air Terjun (Waterfall Road), George Town
 Sri Kunj Bihari Temple, George Town
 Nagarathar Sivan Temple, Jalan Dato Keramat, George Town
 Sri Kamatchi Amman Temple, Jalan Dato Keramat, George Town
 Sri Raja Mariamman Temple, Jalan Kampung Jawa Baru, George Town
 Sri Poongka Munneswarar Temple, Jalan Kampung Jawa Baru, George Town
 Sri Madurai Veeran Temple, Jalan Timah, George Town
 Sri Kamatchi Amman Temple, Jalan Sungai Pinang, George Town
 Sri Muniswarar Temple, Jalan Jkr, Sungai Pinang, George Town
 Sri Balamurugar Temple, Jalan Kajang, George Town
 Sri Muthu Mariamman Temple, Lorong Kulit, George Town
 Sri Karumariamman Temple, Dhoby Ghaut, George Town
 Sri Ramar Temple, Solok York, George Town
 Sri Muthu Mariamman Temple, Solok York, George Town
 Sri Aatrangkarai Vinayagar Temple, Solok York, George Town
 Sri Jadamuneeswarar Temple, Solok York, George Town
 Sti Throubathai Amman Temple, Solok York, George Town
 Sri Sivasakthi Amman Temple, Jalan Air Itam, George Town
 Sri Ambakarathoor Pathrakaliamman Temple, Jalan Air Itam, George Town
 Sri Rudra Veera Muthu Maha Mariamman Temple, Jalan Air Itam, George Town
 Sri Maha Muneeswarar Temple, Jalan Pokok Cherry, George Town
 Sri Aruloli Thirumurugan Temple, Bukit Bendera, George Town
 Sri Rokku Malai Muneeswarar Temple, Paya Terubong, George Town
 Sri Sivasakthi Aiyappar Temple, Jalan Mount Erskine, George Town
 Sri Sakthi Vinayagar Temple, Jalan Fettes, Tanjung Tokong, George Town
 Sri Maha Mariamman Temple, Tanjung Bunga, George Town
 Sri Kadalora Kaliamman Temple, Tanjung Bunga, George Town
 Sri Singamuga Kaliamman Temple, Teluk Bahang
 Sri Munesswaran Temple, Teluk Bahang
 Shree Maha Letchumi Temple, Macallum Street, Georgetown
 Sri Muthu Mariamman Thandayuthapani Temple, Balik Pulau
 Sri Manalmedu Muthu Mariamman Temple, Balik Pulau
 Sri Muthu Mariamman Muneeswarar Temple, Bayan Lepas
 Sri Visvanathar Visalatchi Temple, Jalan Tokong Ular, Bayan Baru
 Sri Veera Kaliamman Temple, Batu Uban, George Town
 Sri Krishnar Temple, Sungai Dua, George Town
 Sri Veera Makaliamman Temple, Gelugor, George Town
 Sri Muneeswarar Temple, Jalan Tengku Kudin (Udini Road), George Town
 Sri Aathi Baghavathi Temple, Bukit Gelugur, George Town
 Sri Ragunatha Swami Madalayam, Bukit Gelugur, George Town
 Sri Veera Makaliamman Temple, Lorong Ipoh, Jelutong, George Town
 Sri Vazhividum Murugar Temple, Jalan Gurdwara, George Town
 Sri Ashtambar Muneeswarar Temple, Jalan Gurdwara, George Town
 Sri Murugar Temple, Sungai Ara
 Sri Maha Kaliamman Temple, Jalan Batu Gantung, George Town
 Sri Aghora Veerapathra Temple, Jalan Batu Gantung, George Town
 Sri Dharma Muneeeswarar Temple, Jalan Kampung Pisang, George Town
 Sri Muneeswarar Temple, Jalan Kelawai, Pulau Tikus, George Town
 Sri Dhurga Devi Temple, Jalan Kelawai, Pulau Tikus, George Town
 Sri SivaShakti Durgaiamman, George Town
 Sri Saiva Muneeswarar Alayam, Island Glades

Mainland
 Sree Maha Mariamman Devasthanam Temple, Butterworth
 Arulmigu Sri Muthu Mariamman Temple Sungai Puyu, Butterworth
 Dewi Sree Veerapathra Maha Kaliamman Temple, Butterworth
 Sri Radha Krishna Temple, Butterworth
 Sri Maha Mariamman Temple, Kepala Batas, Penang
 Sri Thandayuthapani Kovil, Jawi
 Sri Thiruthani Kalyana Murugan Temple, Nibong Tebal, Seberang Perai Selatan
 Sri Thandayuthapani Kovil, Bukit Mertajam
 Sri Sangilikarrupar Kaliamman Temple, Butterworth
 Sri Angalla Paramesvary Temple No. 1864/2, Jalan Assumption, Butterworth
 Sri Mangalanayagi Amman Devasthanam, Bukit Mertajam
 Arulmigu Karumariamman Temple, Seberang Jaya
 Jalan Baru Sri Muniswarar Temple, Perai
 Sri Kaalikambal Amman Temple, Perai
 Sri Selva Vinayagar Temple, Perai
 Sri Meenakshi Amman Kovil, Simpang Ampat
 Sree Sithi Vinayager Devasthanam, Nibong Tebal, Seberang Perai Selatan
 Sri Saiva Muniswarar-Naga Karumariamman Temple, Jalan Heng Choon Thian, Butterworth
 Throwpathi Amman Temple, Pokok Machang, Butterworth
 Sri Jadah Muniswaran Temple, Bagan Lebai Tahir, Butterworth
 Sri Akni Muniswarar Temple, Permatang Tinggi
 Sri Muniswaran Alayam, Penanti
 Sri Maha Mutthalaman Alayam, Simpang Ampat

Perak
 Arulmigu Sri Subramaniar Alayam, Langkap
 Sri Maha Sivalayam Aulong, Taiping
 Arulmigu Sri Maha Amman Temple, Jalan Kota, Taiping
 Shri Maha Ganesha Temple, Jalan Stesen, Taiping
 Sivan Temple, Taiping
 Sri Navanetha Krishna Temple, Taiping
 Sri Tendhayuthapani Murugan Temple, Taiping
 Kallu Malai Murugan Temple, Bukit Larut (Maxwell), Taiping
 Shri Maha Kaliamman Temple, Jalan Kota Taiping.
 Sri Sithi Vinaygar Temple, Pokok Assam, Taiping
 Marathandavar Muniswaran Temple, Jalan Tupai, Taiping
 Sri Arulandan Muniswaran Sivan, Mariamman Temple, Simpang Halt Taiping
 Sri Mariaman Temple, Kg Expo, Kamunting, Taiping
 Sree Senthil Vel Murugan Aalayam, Tong Wah Estate, Tapah
 Sree Maha Muthu Mariamman, TRP Taiping
 Sri Maha Lechumy Amman Alayam, Slim River
 Sri Meenachiamman Alayam, Slim River
 Arulmigu Annai Devi Sri Karumariamman Alayam, Bedford/Slim Village, Slim River
 Sree Bathra Kaliamman Temple, Fair Park, Ipoh
 Arulmigu Thandayuthabani Alayam Teluk Intan
 Sri Venkateswara Devastanamu Sungai Sumun, Hutan Melintang, Teluk Intan
 Aruligu Mariaman Alayam Kg Kilang, Beruas
 Arulmigu Sri Subramaniar Alayam, Beruas
 Om Sri Maha Nagakanniamman Temple, Changkat, Batu Gajah
 Sri Subramaniyar Swamy Temple, Batu Gajah
 Arulmigu Sri Maha Mariamman Temple, Buntong Ipoh
 Sri Maha Kaliamman Temple, Buntong Ipoh
 Kallumalai Arulmigu Sri Subramaniyar Temple, Gunong Cheroh, Ipoh
 Arulmigu Sri Maha Batrakaliamman Temple, Batu Gajah
 Arulmigu Nagammal Paripalana Sabah
 Sri Kaliamman Temple, Jalan Tanjung Tualang, Batu Gajah
 Sri Sithi Vinayagar Temple, Bidor, Perak
 Sri Maha Mariamman Temple, MTD Batu Gajah
 Arulmigu Sri Muthu Mariamman Temple, Changkat Batu Gajah
 Om Sri Arulmigu Sivasakthi Alayam Changkat Batu Gajah
 Sri Ayyanar Temple, Ulu Sepetang
 Sri Buloh Kali Ammah Alayam, Batu 24, Jalan Bagan Datoh, Selekoh, Perak
 Sri Anantha Nadarajar Alayam, (Hindu Sabah Sivan Koyil) No 1152, Jalan Syed Abu Bakar, Teluk Intan
 Sri Seethala Maha Mariamman Alayam, Batu 4, Teluk Intan
 Arulmigu Sri Maha Mariamman Alayam, Kota Baharu, Gopeng
 Om Sri Laksmi Sameithe Sri Sunderajar Perumal Kovil, Jalan Lahat, Ipoh
 Om Sri Veeramuthukaliamman (Kunggumangi), Kg Chekkadi, Buntong, Ipoh
 Sri Thiroubathi Amman Temple Ladang Kalumpong Bagan Serai
 Sree Maha Muthu Mari Amman Temple Ladang Jin Seng Bagan Serai
 Sri Ramar Temple, Lumut, Perak (Naval Base)
 Arulmigu Sri Raja Rajeswari Amman Temple, Menglembu, Ipoh

Selangor
 Batu Caves
 Sri Maha Muniswarar Alayam, Taman Seri Berembang, Pelabuhan Klang
Kuil Sri Perumal Simpang Morib Banting Kuala Langat
Sri maha mariamman tample, Taman Glenmarie, U1/80, Jalan Subang, Batu 3, Shah Alam
Devi Sri Maha Karumariamman, Sri Muniswarar, Sri Kottai Muniandy Temple, Batu 2 Jalan Langat, Klang
 Sungai Buloh Sri 18 Bhagavathi Amman Temple
Arulmigu Sri Subramaniyar Alayam, Rawang
 Sri Devi Padaivetri Maha Mariamman Kovil, Bt 5 1/2 Meru, Klang
 Sri Maha Mariamman Temple, Bandar Baru Salak Tinggi, Sepang
 Sri Maha Mariamman Alayam, Bukit Kemuning 12 km, Shah Alam
 Sri Subramaniam Kovil
 Sri Subramaniar Alayam, Sepang, Selangor
 Sri Sitthi Vinayagar Kovil, Petaling Jaya
 Sri Sakthi Easwari Kovil, Petaling Jaya
 Sri Shivan Temple, Bukit Gasing
 Sri Subramaniar Kovil, Petaling Jaya
 Sri Subramania Swamy Kovil, Klang
 Sri Sivan Kovil, Kota Road, Klang
 Sri Maha Mariamman Kovil, Klang
 Sri Maha Mariamman Kovil, Sungai Buloh
 Sri Selva Vinayagar Kovil, Klang
 Sri Raja Rajeswary Kovil, Ampang
 Sri Sakthi Vinayagar Alayam, Ampang
 Sri Thruga Parameswary Amman Alayam, Kampung Tumbuk, Tanjong Sepat, Selangor
 Sri Subramaniaswami Temple Paribalana Sabai, Kajang
 Sri Sundaraja Perumal Kovil, Klang
 Sri Maha Mariamman Temple, Telok Panglima Garang, Banting
 Sri Maha Mariamman Temple, Klang
 Sri Maha Mariamman Alayam, Kg Muhibah, Rawang
 Sri Vartharaja Perumal Temple, SS 13 Subang Jaya
 Sri Veerakathy Vinayagar Temple, Rawang
 sri subramaniam swamy kovil, Jalan reko kajang
 Sri Maha Mariamman Temple, Jalan Anggerik Vanilla, Kota Kemuning, Shah Alam
 Seafield Sri Maha Mariamman Temple, UEP Subang Jaya
 Sri Murugan Temple, Persiaran Selangor, Shah Alam (CSR Sugar)
 Sri Murugan Temple Bandar Sunway, Subang Jaya
 Sri Vengadachalapathy Temple, Puchong, Subang Jaya
 Sri Maha Maheswari Kaliamman Temple, Batu 14 Puchong
 Sri Maha Mariamman Temple, Batu 14 Puchong
 Sri Srinivasa Perumal Temple, Pusat Bandar Puchong
 Sri Naga Nageswary Amman Temple, Puchong
 Sri Maha Kaliamman Temple, Seafield, Subang Jaya (demolished)
 Sri Subramaniar Aalaya, Semenyih
 Sri Maha Kaliamman Temple, Kampung Sireh, Semenyih
 Sri Maha Mariamman Temple, Ladang Rinching, Semenyih
 Sri Veppilaikari Mariamman Aalayam, Sa-ringgit Est, Semenyih
 Sri Maha Mariamman Temple, HICOM, Shah Alam
 Om Sri Maha Veera Jada Muneswarar Alayam (Jalan E3/1), Taman Ehsan, Kepong
 Sri Rajarajeswari Alayam, Taman Sri Sentosa, Klang
 Sri Subramaniar Kovil, Port Klang
 Sri Maha Muneeswarar Aalayam, Jalan Klang Banting, Klang Selangor
 Sri Muniswaran Temple, Bukit Tinggi, Klang
 Arulmigu Sri Subramaniar Temple, Kerling
 Sri Sithivinayagar Temple Jalan Pahang, Kuala Kubu Bharu
 Sri Pottu Veerar Aalayam, Batu Belah, Meru, Klang
 sri thurobathai amman alayam, tongkah, Banting
 Arulmigu Om Sri Muneeswaran Alayam, Tepi Sungai Klang
 Arulmigu Om Sri Raaja Muniswarar Alayam, Jalan Besar, Pandamaran
 Sri Sitthi Vinayagar, Taman Kim Chuan, Pandamaran, Klang
 Om Sri Maha Mariamman Alayam, Pandamaran, Klang
 Om Sri Vettaikara Pandimuni Kaliamman Alayam, Pandamaran, Klang
 Sri VeeraBhatra Kaliammal Temple, Sg.Jelok, Kajang
 Arulmigu Agora Veerabathirar-Sanggili Karuppar Alayam, Kg. Benggali, Rawang
 Anggala Parameswari / Pechayi Amman Temple, Ladang Bukit Talang, Kuala Selangor
 Sri Muneerwaran Temple, Ladang Tuan Mee
 Sri Rama Baktha Raja PanjaMukha Aanjaneyar Temple (Taman Sentosa Klang and Vanarai Padai Urumi Melam Members)
 Sri Balasubramaniar Alayam Sungai Tinggi Estate Batang Berjuntai
 Kuil Sri Maha Muniswarar, Ampang Local Council, Bandar Baru Ampang
 Kuil Aum Siva Sri Muneeswarar, Kampung Benggali, Rawang
 Sri Maha Mariamman Old temple Bukit Rajah New Division, Klang
 Sri Maha Mariamman, Kg. Kayu Ara, Damansara, Petaling Jaya
 Sri Sithi Vinayagar Tanjung Karang
 Kuil Sri Maha Kaligambaal Muneeswarar Puchong Utama
 Arulmigu Sri Ayyappaswamy Devasthanam, Batu Caves
 Sri Raja Kaliamman alayam, Taman Sentosa, Klang
 Sri Maha Maariyamman alayam, Bandar Rinching, 43500 Semenyih Selangor
 Sri Maha Karumaariyamman Alayam, Taman Batu Untong, 42800 Tanjung Sepat
 Sri Jegan Matha Sri Veeravettaikara Muniandy Alayam, Pandamaran, Port Klang
 SriSakthitriyambaganathar Kovil Veedu/ Srisakthitriyambaganathar Shiva Peedam, Shah alam Seksyen 27
Om Agilandha Aathi Muniswarar Alayam, No 17 Lorong Awan 2, Kuala Ampang
 Sri Veerabathra Kaaliamman Temple, Kajang
 Sri Maha Karumariamman Temple, Banting
 Sri Maha Marriamman Temple, Ladang Dominion, Semenyih
 Sri Ayinariswar Temple, Jalan Genting Kelang Setapak

Terengganu

 Sri Maha Mariamman Temple, Chukai, Kemaman
 Sri Kali Yuga Durga Lakshmi Amman Temple, Jalan Cherong Lanjut, Kuala Terengganu
 Sri Soola Amman Temple, Kuala Terengganu
 Sri Maha Mariamman, Kemaman
 Sri Maha Dakshanakali Temple Jabor, Kemaman

Negeri Sembilan
 Sri Rajakaliamman Sri Dato Alayam, Seremban
 Sri Muneeswarar Alayam, Taman Labu Jaya, Seremban
 Sri Maha Mariamman, Port Dickson
 Sri Mahamariamman Temple, Jalan Dr Muthu
 Sri Bala Thandayuthapani Temple, Paul Street
 Sri Mahamariamman Temple, Taman Rasah Jaya
 Dewi Sri Maha Mariamman Thiruthondar Peravai, Pajam, Mantin
 Sri Maha Mariamman Temple, Jalan Besar, Mantin
 Om Sri Anjaneyar Aalayam, Jalan Pantai, Port Dickson
 Sri Maha Mariamman Aalayam, Dusun Nyior Seremban
 Sri Palanimalai Murugan Temple, Ulu Temiang, Seremban
 Sri Murugan Temple, Siliau, Port Dickson
 Sri Balathandayuthapani Temple, Rantau
 Arulmighu Maha Sapthakaniga Devi Temple, Bukit Kepayang 2
 Sri Maha Mariamman Temple, Bukit Tembok
 Sri Puthu Vinayagar temple, Bukit Tembok
 Sri Maha Mariamman Temple, Rasah
 Sri Kottai Muniswaran Temple, Taman Minang, Port Dickson
 Arulmighu Maha Sapthakanniga Devi Temple, Kanni Koil
 Sri Durga Temple, Taman Senawang Jaya Senawang
 Taman Sri Permata Mariamman Temple, Sungai Ujong
 Sri Murugan Temple, Mambau Seremban
 Sri Muniswarar Temple, Loco Railway Qrts, Rasah Seremban
 Arulmigu Om Sri Muneeswaran Alayam, T Springhill
 Sri Kanthasamy Temple, Kuala Pilah, Negeri Sembilan
 Sri Maha Raja Rajeswarar Temple Tmn Tuanku Jaafar NSDK (Sivan Alayam)
 Dewi Sri Naagaputru Karumariamman Temple, Lukut, Port Dickson
 Mariamman Temple, Rasah Jaya 5/12
 Sri Subramaniayar Bala Thendayuthapani Lobak, Jalan Tan Sri Manicavasagam, Seremban
 Sri Raja Kottai Muniswarar, Taman Sri Senawang, Tuanku Jaafar
 Dewi Sri Maha Mariamman Temple Pajam
 Sri Maha Kaliamman Temple, Kg. Benggali, Port Dickson
 Sri Sivasanggara Valmuni Vanamuni Alayam, Rantau
 Arulmigu Subramaniar Temple
Sri Ambal Alayam, Kampung Arab, Port Dickson

Malacca
 Sri Mathuraiveeran, Raja Karumariamman & Tuak Pek Kong Temple Jasin, Melaka Chindian Temple
 Sri Subramaniar Thuropathai Amman Alayam, Gajah Berang
 Sri mani Alayam, Batu Berendam
 Sri Mutu Mariam Alayam, Bukit Beruang
 Sri Maha Mariamman Temple, Gajah Berang
 Sri Maha Mariamman Temple, Pengakalan Rama
 Sri Maa Veeran Temple (Madurai Veeran Temple)
 Sri Maha Mariamman Temple, Taman Sri Sebang, Pulau Sebang, Alor Gajah
 Sri Maha Mariamman Temple, Kampung Pulau Sebang, Jalan Simpang Empat, Pulau Sebang, Alor Gajah
 Sri Kailasanathar Temple
 Sri Bala Thandayudabani Temple, Naning division, Simpat Empat
 Sri Mookambikai Temple, Simpang Empat, Alor Gajah
 Arulmigu Sannasimalai Andavar Temple, Cheng
 Sundaramoorti Vinayagar Temple
 Sri Maha Kaaliamman Temple, Jalan Hutan Percha, Alor Gajah
Sri Astha Thasa Bhuja Kaliamman, Durian Tunggal,
Sri Nondi Samy Alayam Temple, Jalan Pengkalan, Alor Gajah
Sri Poyatha Moorthi Temple, Jalan Tokong
Devi Sri Karu Maha Kaliamman Temple, Jasin
Sri Maha Karumariamman Estate Air Panas, Alor Gajah
Sri Sithi Vinayagar Temple, Alor Gajah
Sri Maha Mariamman Estate Kemuning Kru, Alor Gajah
Sri Subramaniar Alayam Bertam Estate, Durian Tunggal
Dewi Sri Maha Karumariamman Temple (Kuturai Kovil), Cheng
Shree Ambaji Temple, Ujong Pasir Melaka
Sri Kuil Arulmigu Sannasimalai Andavar, Cheng
Sri Sivan Aalayam, Jasin (Jalan Jasin)
Sri Mahaa Maariamman Aalayam, Jasin (Jalan Jasin)
Sri Vanathandavar Alayam, Sungai Udang Melaka (Army Temple)

Johor
Persatuan Penganut Maha Mariamman - Taman Megah Ria / Kota Puteri, Masai
Arulmigu Sri Siva Sakhti Chinna Karupar Alayam, Bandar Seri Alam
 Arulmigu Sri Muniswarar Sri Mariamman Alayam, Kangkar Tebrau
 Sri Vallitheivanai Murugan, Panchor, Muar
 Arulmigu Menaatchi Amman Alaiyam, Kampung Oren, Ulu Tiram
 Sri Devi Karumariamman Temple, Taman Dato Chellam, Ulu Tiram
 Sri Muthu Mariamman Temple – Muar, Muar District
 Sri Nagamalai Koil Alaiyam – Bukit Pasir, Muar, Muar District
 Arulmigu Sri Maha Mariamman Muttapan Alayam – Batu Anam
 Sri Subramaniar Temple – Labis, Segamat District
 Sri Devi Karumariamman Temple – Kg.Boopathi, Chaah, Segamat
 Sri Maha Mariamman Alayam – Chua Estate Ladang Sungai, Labis, Segamat District
 Aathiparasakhti Aalayam – Labis, Segamat District
 Sri Muniswarar Thiru Kovil – Lorong Mempelam, Jalan Skudai, Tampoi
 Arulmigu Sri Raja Mariamman Devasthanam – Jalan Ungku Puan, Bandaraya, Johor Bahru
 Sri Maha Subramaniam Kovil – Skudai
 Thandayuthabani Kovil – Wadi Hana, Johor Bahru
 Sri Maha Kaliamman Kovil – Wadi Hana, Johor Bahru
 Sri Subramaniam Kovil – Masai, Johor Bahru District
 Persatuan Penganut Arulmigu Dewi Sri Maha Karumariamman Temple, Taman Tanjong Puteri Resort, Pasir Gudang
 Sri Muneswaran Kovil – Masai, Johor Bahru
 Maha Kaliamman Kovil – Masai, Johor Bahru
 Dewa Sri Hanumar Thiru Kovil – Tmn Damai Jaya, Skudai, Johor Bahru
 Arulmigu Sri Maha NagaKarumariamman Alayam – Tmn Damai Jaya, Skudai
 Kuil Sri Subramaniar Tangkak Johor
 Arulmigu Sithi Vinayagar Thirukkovil – Johor Jaya
 Arulmigu Sri Athi Siva Sakthi Kanthariswarar Temple – Kampung Melayu Niyor, Kluang
 Sri Maha Mariamman Temple – Jalan Hospital Kluang, Kluang
 Sri Vel Murugan Alayam - Jalan Satu, Taman Bersatu, Kluang
 Aathi Parasakthi Temple - Jalan Mengkibol, Kluang
 Sri Jeya Subramaniar Alayam – Kampung MIC, Sri Lalang Jalan Batu Pahat, Kluang
  Sri ThiruMurugan Alayam - Kem Geresan, Kluang
 Sri Durgaiamman Alayam, Kampung Majid, Kluang
 Sri Nagakani Alayam, Padang Tembak, Kluang, Johor
 Sri Bathrakaliamman Alayam, Kluang Estate, 
 Sri Raja Rajeswari Temple, Kluang 
 Arulmigu Sri Raja Kaliamman Glass Temple – Bandaraya Johor Bahru
 Sri Mahamariammam Temple – Tai Tak Kota Tinggi
 Sri Maha Marriamman – Ladang New Pogoh, Segamat District
 Sri Karumariamman, Alayam – Ladang Sagil
 Arulmigu Sri Thandayuthapani Alayam, Segamat District
 Sri Maha Mariamman Alayam, Segamat District
 Sri Maha Karumariamman Alayam – Sungai Senarut, Batu Anam
 Maha Mariamman Alayam – Kg. Kenangan, Batu Anam
 Sri Maha Kaliamman Alayam – Batu Anam
 Dewi Sri Meenachi Amman- Ladang Mount Austin, Taman Seri Austin
 Persatuan Sri Rama Thootha Baktha Hanuman Alayam Senai Kampung Sepakat
 Shree Rama Bhaktha Hanuman Temple
Sri Ayyapan Devasthanam, Desa Tebrau
Sri Maha Kaliamman Alayam Jalan Genuang Segamat
Sri Mariamman Temple Pari Palana Saba Jalan Kluang, Batu Pahat
Arulmigu Menenatchy Sundareswarar (Maragathalingeswar) Thirukovil Jalan Kluang, Batu Pahat
Persatuan Penganut Dewa Om Sri Mangkadu Veera Kaliamman Alayam Jalan Tanjung Laboh, Batu Pahat

Pahang
 Sri Maha Mariamman Alayam - Jalan Chamang, Bentong
 Sri Maha Mariamman Temple – Jalan Kemunting, Kuantan
 Sri Sitti Vinayagar Temple – Bukit Ubi, Kuantan
 Sri Subramaniar Aalayam – Jalan Sungai Lembing, Kuantan
 Sri Maha Mariamman Temple – Tanah Ratah, Cameron Highlands
 Sri Maha Mariamman Temple – Bue Valley, Cameron Highlands
 Sri Subramaniyar Temple – Tanah Rata, Cameron Highlands
 Sri Subramaniyar Temple – Ringlet, Cameron Highlands
 Sri Subramaniyar Temple – Kuala Terla, Cameron Highlands
 Sri Thandayuthabani Temple – Brinchang, Cameron Highlands
 Sri Maha Mariaman Temple – Boh Tea Estate, Cameron Highlands
 Sri Maha Mariamman Temple – Sungai Palas Estate, Cameron Highlands
 Thanggala Kaliamman Alayam – Ladang Kelapa Sawit, Bukit Koman, Raub
 Sri Subramaniyar Alayam – Raub
 Sri Maha Mariamman Alayam – Rotan Tunggal, Raub
 Kallukori Sri Kaliamman Alayam – Mentakab
 Sri Maha Mariamman Alayam – Mentakab
 Sri Subramaniar Alayam – Mentakab
 Sri Maha Mariammam Temple Mentakab Estate – Mentakab
 Sri Maha Mariamman Temple – Temerloh
 Sri Marathandavar Bala Dhandayuthapani Alayam, Maran
 Kuil Arulmigu Sri Batumalai Andavar, Batu 18, Jalan Lipis/Raub, Benta
 Kuil Sri Maha Mariamman Ladang Benta, Benta
 Sri Attur Amman Alayam – Benta 10 Pahang, Kuala Lipis
 Sri Subramaniar Aalayam, Jalan Benta, Kuala Lipis
 Sri Maha Mariamman Temple – Budu Estate Benta, Kuala Lipis
 sri maha muthumariamman aalayam – Jengka 16
 sri sithi vinayagar aalayam – Jengka 21
 sri maha mariamman – Jengka 13
 sri maha muniyandhi aalayam – Mentakab
 Dewi Sri Maha Chamundeswary – Kampung Sri Jaya, Maran

Kelantan
 Sri Maha Karumariamman Temple, Karumaripuram, Kerilla Estate, Tanah Merah
 Sri Marthanda Vilva Muniswarar Alayam, Kuala Krai
 Sri Maha Muthu Mariamman Temple, Tumpat
 Sivasubramaniyam Temple, Kota Bharu
 Thiru Murugan Temple, Kuala Krai
 Shri Maha Kaliaman Alayam, Taman Guchil Jaya, Kuala Krai
 Sri Subramaniasamy Temple, Gua Musang
 Sri Marthanda Vilva Muniswarar Alayam, Kuala Krai

East Malaysia

Sabah

 Sri Subramaniar Temple – Kem Lok Kawi, Lot 100 Jalan Lama Penampang - Kinarut, Kota Kinabalu
 Sri Pasupathinath Alayam (with Murugan Sannithi) – Jalan Khidmat, Kota Kinabalu
 Thirumurugan Temple – Tawau
 Sri Sivan Kovil (with Murugan Sannithi) – Camp Paradise, Kota Belud
 Sri Sithi Vinayagar Temple, Sandakan

Sarawak
 Mount Matang Maha Mariamman Temple – Mount Matang, Kuching
 Sri Srinivasagar Kaliamman Temple – Ban Hock Road, Kuching
 Sri Maha Mariamman Temple – Batu Lintang, Kuching
 Sri Maha Mariamman Temple – Jalan Orchid, Sibu
 Sri Kamini Durga Eswari Amman Temple - Taman Tunku, Miri

Labuan
 Thiru Murugan Temple – Pangkalan Udara Labuan, Membedai

See also
 Lists of Hindu temples

References

Malaysia
Temples
Hindu temples